Sir Alfred Davies Devonsher Broughton (18 October 1902 – 2 April 1979) was a British Labour Party politician.

Early life
Broughton was educated at Rossall School, Downing College, Cambridge and the London Hospital and became a doctor, a member of a family who had been Batley doctors for 70 years. During World War II he worked in civil defence and in the medical branch of the Royal Air Force. He was a member of Batley Borough Council 1946–49.

Parliamentary career
Broughton was Member of Parliament for Batley and Morley from a 1949 by-election. He was an opposition whip in 1960. Broughton was in poor health throughout the 1970s, spending much of the time living in hospital in Yorkshire. The fact that the Labour government's majority had been lost meant that his treatment was often disrupted so that he could be taken down to London to be 'nodded through' to win key votes.

1979 no confidence vote and death
On 28 March 1979 the government faced a knife-edge vote of no confidence when Broughton was on his death bed. Broughton's doctors were extremely concerned for him and strongly advised him not to travel. Although he was willing to come down to vote knowing that death was imminent, Prime Minister James Callaghan decided it would be unacceptable to ask him to do so, in case he died during the ambulance journey. In the event, the government lost by one vote; had Broughton been present, assuming Speaker George Thomas would have broken the tie in favour of the status quo per Speaker Denison's rule, the Government would have survived. Broughton died five days later, aged 76.

In popular culture
On 8 June 2009 an afternoon play called How Are You Feeling, Alf? about Broughton and the 1979 no confidence vote was aired on BBC Radio 4. It was written by James Graham and featured David Ryall as Broughton and Malcolm Tierney as James Callaghan. Three years later, Graham wrote This House, first staged by the National Theatre, which expanded on the political situation in the 1970s, in which Broughton is a key character.

References

External links 
 
Times Guide to the House of Commons October 1974

1902 births
1979 deaths
Labour Party (UK) MPs for English constituencies
Councillors in West Yorkshire
UK MPs 1945–1950
UK MPs 1950–1951
UK MPs 1951–1955
UK MPs 1955–1959
UK MPs 1959–1964
UK MPs 1964–1966
UK MPs 1966–1970
UK MPs 1970–1974
UK MPs 1974
UK MPs 1974–1979
People educated at Rossall School
Alumni of Downing College, Cambridge
Royal Air Force personnel of World War II
Knights Bachelor
Politicians awarded knighthoods
Civil Defence Service personnel